Chromatocera is a genus of bristle flies in the family Tachinidae. There are at least three described species in Chromatocera.

Species
 Chromatocera fumator Reinhard, 1962
 Chromatocera harrisi (Reinhard, 1935)
 Chromatocera setigena (Coquillett, 1897)

References

Further reading

External links

 

Tachininae